Lampridia is a genus of moths of the family Crambidae. It contains only one species, Lampridia fuliginalis, which is found on Sulawesi.

References

Pyraustinae
Crambidae genera
Monotypic moth genera